is a 1996 Japanese drama film directed by Yōichi Higashi. It is the story of two Japanese twin brothers growing up in post-war rural Japan. The film won the Silver Bear for an outstanding single achievement at the 46th Berlin International Film Festival.

Cast
 Mieko Harada as Mizue Tashima (mother)
 Keigo Matsuyama as Seizo Tashima
 Shogo Matsuyama as Yukihiko Tashima
 Kyozo Nagatsuka as Kenzo Tashima (father)
 Kaneko Iwasaki as Toshie
 Hosei Komatsu as Grandfather
 Tokuko Sugiyama as Grandmother
 Koichi Ueda as Iwata, Principal

References

External links
 

1996 films
1996 drama films
Japanese drama films
1990s Japanese-language films
Films about children
Films about twin brothers
Films set in the 1940s
Films directed by Yōichi Higashi
1990s Japanese films